Al Zerbarini (died 2 May 2012) was an American gasser drag racer.

Zerbarini drove an Oldsmobile-powered 1940 Willys dubbed Bee Line, sponsored by Bee-Line Automotive of Stamford, Connecticut, beginning in 1960.

He won NHRA's first ever A/Gas Altered (A/GA) national title at Detroit Dragway in 1960.

Zerbarini continued racing until 1968 but won no other NHRA gasser titles.

References

Sources
Davis, Larry. Gasser Wars, North Branch, MN:  Cartech, 2003, pp. 180–6.

Dragster drivers
American racing drivers
2012 deaths